So Fresh: The Hits of Summer 2016 is a 21 track compilation album by Various Artists that was released through Sony Music Entertainment Australia and Universal Music Australia on 27 November 2015. A two disc deluxe edition of the album, So Fresh: The Hits of Summer 2016 + The Best of 2015, features a total of 43 tracks. Since its release, the compilation has been certified Platinum by ARIA.

Track listing

Charts

Weekly charts

Year-end charts

Certifications

References

So Fresh albums
2015 compilation albums